Vladislava Ukraintseva (born 20 October 1971) is a Russian sailor. She competed in the women's 470 event at the 2000 Summer Olympics.

References

External links
 

1971 births
Living people
Russian female sailors (sport)
Olympic sailors of Russia
Sailors at the 2000 Summer Olympics – 470
Place of birth missing (living people)